Edsard Frederik Schlingemann (6 September 1966 – 8 May 1990) was a Dutch swimmer who competed in at the Olympic Games of 1984 in Los Angeles. He finished seventh in the 4×200 m freestyle relay and failed to reach the final of the 4×100 m freestyle relay. Schlingemann also missed the finals in his 100 m freestyle and 200 m individual medley races.

Schlingemann represented The Netherlands at the 1982 and 1986 World Championships and the European Championships of 1983 and 1985.

He died aged 23 in a car crash on his way to training.

References

1966 births
1990 deaths
Dutch male medley swimmers
Dutch male freestyle swimmers
Male medley swimmers
Olympic swimmers of the Netherlands
Swimmers at the 1984 Summer Olympics
People from Kitwe
European Aquatics Championships medalists in swimming
Road incident deaths in the Netherlands